Robert Thompson Secrest (January 22, 1904 near Senecaville, Ohio – May 15, 1994, in Cambridge, Ohio) was an American Democratic representative to the United States Congress from the state of Ohio. He served in Congress three separate times: 1933 to 1942, 1949 to 1954, and 1963 to 1966, resigning each time prior to the end of his term.

Biography
Robert Secrest was born at Senacaville, Guernsey County, Ohio, the eldest son of a miner, Robert Waits Secrest (1880-1929), and his wife Amelia née Thompson. Robert attended the State public schools. He subsequently graduated from Muskingum College in New Concord, Ohio, 1926, Washington, D.C. College of Law, 1938, and Columbia University, New York City, 1943. He graduated from British School of Civil Affairs, Wimbledon, England, 1943.

Secrest was superintendent of the Murray City, Ohio schools 1931-1932. He was a member of the Ohio House of Representatives 1931 - 1932. He was elected as a Democrat to the rd to th United States Congresses, and served March 4, 1933 to August 3, 1942, when he resigned to join the United States Navy. He was later promoted to Commander and served until February 28, 1946 in England, Africa, Italy and the Pacific.

Secrest ran unsuccessfully for Congress in 1946, and acted as legal supervisor for the Library of Congress in 1946 - 1947. He was elected to the st through rd Congresses, and served January 3, 1949 to September 26, 1954, when he resigned to become a member of the Federal Trade Commission. He served on that commission 1954 - 1961, and was Director of Commerce, State of Ohio in 1962.

Secrest again was elected to the th and th Congresses, and served January 3, 1963 to December 30, 1966, when he again resigned after failing at re-election in 1966. He was a member of the Ohio State Senate, 1969–1973, and member of the National Council of the American Legion, 1978 to 1987. He died May 15, 1994 in Cambridge, Ohio. At the time of his death, he was the earliest serving former congressman as well as the last one to have served during the Herbert Hoover administration.

References

External links

 

|-

People from Guernsey County, Ohio
1904 births
1994 deaths
Democratic Party Ohio state senators
Muskingum University alumni
Columbia University alumni
Federal Trade Commission personnel
Democratic Party members of the Ohio House of Representatives
United States Navy officers
United States Navy personnel of World War II
20th-century American politicians
People from Noble County, Ohio
Democratic Party members of the United States House of Representatives from Ohio